Grant Maloy Smith (born August 28, 1957) is an American singer, songwriter, musician, and former businessman from Jacksonville, Florida.

Early life 
Smith was born in Jacksonville, Florida and started playing songs of The Beatles with the guitar at an early age. He attended the Rhode Island School of Design but did not complete his tenure there, opting to focus on music.

Early music career 
Smith's first band was called Britannia (1981-1984). In 2008, he and his band opened for the national acts like Elvin Bishop, Steppenwolf, and The Guess Who. Britannia played all original music, written by Smith; one Smith's songs "I'm A Loaded Gun" was included on the 1981 album "Southern New England's Best Rock From JB 105".

Smith was married in 1985 and he continued writing music. The family moved to California in 1991, and Smith joined the Songwriters Guild of America, attending song pitching meetings at their Hollywood offices.

Filmography

Film scoring 
After returning to Rhode Island in 1995, Smith began scoring indie films, including "Code Of Ethics" starring Melissa Leo, an Academy Award-winning actress. He also scored "Pray for Power," starring Lisa Boyle. He worked frequently with directors Christian de Rezendes and Dawn Radican Natalia.

Acting 
In 2019, Grant appeared in the feature film "Oildale", playing the character Brady Cooper, a musician. In the film he performed one of his original songs "I Come From America", which was sung by character in the film.

Full-length movies 
 1997   Night of the Beast
 1998   Boxed Man
 1998   Code of Ethics
 2001   Serial Intentions
 2003   Extra Credit
 2008    Solitaire
 2010   The Rich and the Poor Are Naked
 2011   Pledging Allegiance

Short films 
 2008   PC Noir
 2010   Thinking Through the Drink
 2010   Duet
 2012   Nijinsky's Room
 2012   Cat Scratch

Video feature-length films 
 2001 - Pray for Power
 2002 - Hope High

As an actor 
 2003 - Extra Credit (feature film) as Jake Lawrence
 2019 - Oildale (feature film) as Brady Cooper

Television 
 2009   Mythbusters (Season 7, ep 1) as himself

Pop/rock album period 
From 2008 to 2012, Smith wrote and self-produced with his own label, Small Dog Records, several albums of pop/rock music. The first was Already August, (2008), which blended elements of folk and Americana music with pop and rock ballads.

In 2010 Smith released Big Bowl of Courage, with songs that were generally more rock and roll than the previous album.

The next album was American Merman (2011), where Smith experimented with reggae structures in several tracks.

His final pop/rock album came in 2012, Mister Sparklepants.

Americana music period 
In 2012 Smith transitioned to Americana, or American roots music, a subgenre of country music. He wrote and produced the album "Yellow Trailer" originally released on Smith's own Chinese Sock Puppet Records in 2013, but was remastered and re-released in 2015 on Suburban Cowboy Records. That album was entered into the Grammy Awards the year.

In 2014 Smith was asked by producer Art Greenhaw to sing on several tracks of a Roots Gospel album. He contributed with lead vocals and with one original song of his own "Where Main Street Ends," a gospel version of a song that he had written. This album was entered into the roots gospel category of the Grammys in 2014.

At the end of 2014, Smith was invited by New York producer Perry Margouleff to travel to England and assist him in several shows that singer Paul Rodgers (Bad Company, Free) was doing at the Royal Albert Hall. Smith worked behind the scenes on the entire tour.

In 2015, Smith was asked to narrate a song on a spoken word album that was being produced by Hawaiian-based DJ Cindy Paulos, called Arise Above Abuse: Artists Speak Out for Women. He co-narrated the track "One in Five" with Hawaiian Congresswoman Tulsi Gabbard. He also provided the music for this track and contributed an original song about the kidnapping of women and girls in Africa called "She Would Not Bow Her Head." (from Smith's 2012 Album "Mister Sparklepants").

His next album, "Dust Bowl - American Stories," was released on Suburban Cowboy Records in 2017 and features bassist William Wittman of Cyndi Lauper, and drummer Skoota Warner, as well as keyboardist Tommy Mandel, formerly of Bryan Adams and Dire Straits, who performed on the basic tracks of the album. Production then moved to Nashville, where additional tracks were recorded by IBGMA award-winning dobro player Rob Ickes, fiddle player Steve Stokes of Alabama, cellist Tim Lorsch of Keith Urban, Percy Sledge, accordion player Jeff Taylor of The Time Jumpers, percussionist and drummer Matt Burgess of Willie Nelson, Lynyrd Skynyrd, Jewel, pedal steel player Mike Johnson, of Alison Krauss and Dolly Parton, violinist Lorenza Ponce of Bon Jovi, Adele, Sam Smith, and violinist Rocio Marron of The Voice, under the supervision of co-producer Jeff Silverman.

Because "Dust Bowl - American Stories" is a theme album related to the Dust Bowl of the 1930s, Smith was invited to perform the album at the Kern County Museum, which he did on January 14, 2018. He also performed the entire album for the Bakersfield High School on January 17, 2018, and at the Centennial Rodeo Opry in Oklahoma City in August 2017.

Smith toured the United States, Europe and Mexico. Although primarily a headliner, he sometimes opened for other artists during 2015-2016, including Rita Coolidge, Jon Pousette-Dart, and John Ford Coley. He has performed at The Bitter End in New York, The Clive Davis Theatre at The Grammy Museum, the Troubadour in Hollywood, The National Sylvan Theatre in DC, and The Bluebird Cafe in Nashville. In April 2018, Smith performed on Song Of The Mountains, which is recorded before a live audience and also syndicated on PBS television throughout North America. In August, he performed on Woodsongs Old Time Radio Hour, which is carried by more than 500 radio stations and also broadcast on PBS television.

In 2018, Smith's original song "Man Of Steel" was named the official theme song of the National Veterans Foundation.

In the same year, Smith appeared as one of the performers at The Indie Collaborative's debut public performance at Carnegie Hall.

In 2022, Smith performed a cover of Michael Stephenson’s "My Prison" to raise funds. All funds were donated to the National Veteran's Foundation.

Later in 2022, Smith again performed at Carnegie Hall for the "Celebrating Earth Day in Song" presented by The Indie Collaborative. The event featured award-winning Emmy, Grammy, and Billboard top 10 musical artists.

As an author 
In September 2018 Smith released a Christmas single and children's book that he wrote, called "Fly Possum Fly."  He enlisted country prodigy EmiSunshine to be the featured vocalist on the song.

Before his music career 
Before focusing on his musical career, Smith worked in the scientific measuring equipment industry in various positions. He eventually started his own company, Dewetron America, Inc, which he sold to Dewetron GMBH of Austria, leaving completely in 2017. Smith and his company provided numerous systems to NASA for the Constellation Program. The company won the NASA Tech Briefs Product of the Year Award four times under his leadership, in 2006, 2009, 2012 and 2015.  In 2016 he was requested by MEDICAL DESIGN BRIEFS to write an article outlining his perspective on the future of measuring instruments.

Achievements 
 2017: named the Best Male Americana Artist at the Indie Music Channel Awards, and performed during the awards ceremony at the Troubadour In Los Angeles.
 2017: won two Grammy participation certificates for his work as co-producer on the Grammy-award-winning album "Presidential Suite: Eight Variations on Freedom," by jazz artist Ted Nash.
 2016: named the Best Folk Artist, and won for the Best Americana Roots Song (Old Black Roller) at the Indie Music Channel Awards, and performed during the awards at The Clive Davis Theatre at The Grammy Museum
 2015: winner of the Singer Universe "Best Vocalist of the Month" competition.

Discography

Albums

References

External links

1957 births
20th-century American singers
American male singer-songwriters
Singer-songwriters from Florida
Musicians from Jacksonville, Florida
Living people
20th-century American male singers